This is a list of films produced in the Netherlands before 1910. The films are produced in the Dutch language.

1896-1899

1900-1909

1890s
Films
Lists of 1890s films
Films
Lists of 1900s films